Somdev Devvarman was the defending champion, but chose to compete in Delray Beach instead .

Stéphane Robert won the title, defeating Saketh Myneni in the final 6–3, 6–0 .

Seeds

Draw

Finals

Top half

Bottom half

External links
 Main Draw
 Qualifying Draw

Delhi Open - Singles